The Wise Dan Stakes is a Grade II American thoroughbred horse race for horses four-year-old and older run at a distance of one and one sixteenth of a mile on the turf held annually in June at Churchill Downs racetrack in Louisville, Kentucky.

History

The event was inaugurated on 4 July 1983 as the Firecracker Handicap over a distance of 7 furlongs on a sloppy dirt track and was won by Shot n' Missed who defeated the odds on favorite Dave's Friend in a five horse field. In the third running in 1985 the winner Rapid Gray set a new track record for the distance in a time of 1:21. The event was discontinued for seven years and when it was revived in 1993 it was held on the turf course over a distance of one mile.

The event was classified as Grade III in 1995, and upgraded to Grade II in 2002.

The event attracted several champion turf runners including Kitten's Joy who won the event in 2004 and later that year became U.S. Champion Male Turf Horse and Miesque's Approval who won this event in 2006 and later that year would capture the Breeders' Cup Mile.

The only duel winner was Wise Dan of this event who in 2011 won in his turf debut and 2013.  Later in 2013 Wise Dan was crowned American Horse of the Year for the second year running.

The race was renamed as the Wise Dan Stakes in 2016

The distance was increased from 1 mile to  miles also in 2016.

The race was placed on hiatus in June 2022 due to the suspension of turf racing at Churchill Downs.

Records
Speed records
  miles: 1:40.26  – Kasaqui (ARG) (2017)
 1 mile: 1:33.78  – Jaggery John  (1995)
 7 furlongs: 1:21.20 –  	Rapid Gray  (1985)

Margins 
  lengths – Soviet Line (IRE)  (1997)

Most wins by a jockey
 2 – Robby Albarado (1999, 2014)
 2 – Kent J. Desormeaux (2008, 2009)
 2 – Shane Sellers (2000, 2004)
 2 – Pat Day (1997, 2002)

Most wins by a trainer
 4 – Dale L. Romans (2003, 2004, 2008, 2014)

Winners

Legend:

See also
List of American and Canadian Graded races

External links
 2019 Media guide information from Churchill Downs $250,000 Wise Dan (Grade II) -

References

Graded stakes races in the United States
Grade 2 stakes races in the United States
Turf races in the United States
Open mile category horse races
Churchill Downs horse races
Recurring sporting events established in 1983
1983 establishments in Kentucky